Chal Siah (also Romanized as Chāl Sīāh; also known as Chāleh Sīāh) is a village in Gowavar Rural District, Govar District, Gilan-e Gharb County, Kermanshah Province, Iran. At the 2006 census, its population was 45, in 10 families.

References 

Populated places in Gilan-e Gharb County